Robert Shapiro may refer to:

People
Robert Shapiro (chemist) (1935–2011), American professor emeritus of chemistry at New York University
Robert Shapiro, American CEO of Emlin cosmetics
Robert Shapiro (filmmaker), American film producer
Robert Shapiro (lawyer) (born 1942), American civil litigator
Robert B. Shapiro (born 1938), American businessman, former CEO of Monsanto
Robert H. Shapiro (1935–2004), American chemist and Dean of United States Naval Academy
Robert H. Shapiro, former CEO of Florida based Woodbridge Securities, currently serving a 25year sentence for running a Ponzi scheme 
Robert J. Shapiro (born 1953), American economist
Robert Y. Shapiro, American political scientist

Fictional characters
Robert "Robbie" Shapiro, a character in Nickelodeon's teen sitcom Victorious